Hoërskool Durbanville is a public Afrikaans medium co-educational high school situated in the town of  Durbanville in the Western Cape province of South Africa. It is a public school. It is the oldest High School in the Northern Suburbs of Cape Town, and the only other school older in the Greater Cape Town metropolis is Simons Town School in the southern suburbs.

Founding

The school was established in 1827, as a school catering for children from SubA (Grade 1) to Standard 10 (Grade 12). In 1955 the primary section of the school (SubA to Standard 5) split off to become a school separate from the High school on a separate premises, called Durbanville Primary.

Head Masters

The first head master was  Mellet, H.F. He stayed on until 1838. He was followed in quick succession by: Frylinck,J.,  Ackerman,C.J., de Beer,P.J., Hodgson,G. The headmasters to follow after these were: Roth, J.P.W. (1852-1859), Auret,E.B. (1859-1861), Hoek,J.(1861-1865), d’Arcy,G.A.(1865-1872), Dreyer,H.M.(1872-1875), Poccock,A.A.(1875-1884), Craig,T.(1884-1886), Bain,A.(1886-1887). In 1887 C.J. Haefele was appointed head master and he stayed on until 1921. He was related to the Haefele family from Wupperthal. In 1921 Hugo,D.P. was appointed, followed in 1939 by  Ehlers, P.J., 1941 by Grobbelaar, J.J.S., 1943 by de Jager,A.K.,  1950 by Stimie,C.M., 1969 by  van Niekerk, A.A.J., 1974 by Firmani,O., 1985 by Bezuidenhout,J.W.L. and in 1997 by G Germishuys. The current head master is C Venter who started in 2020.

Language medium and gender

The language medium is Afrikaans. It hosts both sexes.

Hostel

The school has hostel facilities for boys and girls. The hostel opened in 1942.

Motto

Labor Ornat. This is Latin for Work Beautified

Alumni
 Amore Bekker – Radio presenter
 Jack Parow – Rapper.
 Angus Cleophas –  Rugby player. He is a backline player
 Zanne Stapelberg – Opera singer.
 Johnny Trytsman – South African Rugby Player
 Dr. Marthinus Gerhardus Botes (Matric 2007) -  Doctorate in Chemistry

References

Schools in Cape Town
High schools in South Africa
Schools in the Western Cape